Bethany ( (Bethania), which is probably of Aramaic or Hebrew origin, meaning "house of affliction" or "house of figs") is a feminine given name derived from the Biblical place name, Bethany, a town near Jerusalem, at the foot of the Mount of Olives, where Lazarus lived in the New Testament, along with his sisters, Mary and Martha, and where Jesus stayed during Holy Week before his crucifixion.

The name has been well-used in English-speaking countries. It was the 59th most popular name for girls in England and Wales in 2010, having ranked as high as 11th most popular name in those countries in 1999. It was the 79th most popular name for girls in Scotland in 2010. It ranked in the 100 most popular names for girls in the United States during the 1980s, reaching its pinnacle of popularity in 1987, when it was the 87th most popular name for girls, but its use has declined, falling to 369th most popular name there in 2010. The name Bethany is the English transliteration of the Greek name Bethania.  It has been in use as a rare given name in the English-speaking world since the 19th century, used primarily by Catholics in honour of Mary of Bethany.

List
Notable people with the name include:
 Bethany Beardslee (born 1925), American soprano
 Bethany Black (born 1978), English stand-up comedian
 Bethany Campbell, American writer of romance novels
 Bethany Dillon (born 1988), Christian soft rock artist
 Bethany Donaphin (born 1980), American basketball player
 Bethany England (born 1994), English professional footballer
 Bethany Firth (born 1996), Northern Irish swimmer
 Bethany Goldsmith (1927–2004), American baseball pitcher
 Bethany Hall-Long (born 1963), American politician from Delaware
 Bethany Hamilton (born 1990), American surfer and shark attack victim
 Bethany Hart (born 1977), American hammer thrower
 Bethany Kehdy (born 1981), Lebanese-American culinary expert and cookbook author
 Bethany Lee (born 1952), Australian film and television actress
 Bethany Joy Lenz (born 1981), American singer and actress
 Bethany LeSueur (born 1983), American basketball player
 Bethany Anne Lind, American stage and screen actor
 Bethanie Mattek-Sands (born 1985), American tennis player
 Bethany C. Meyers, American fitness entrepreneur 
 Bethany Mooradian (born 1975), American author, lecturer and internet personality
 Bethany Mota (born 1995), American video blogger
 Bethany McLean (born 1970), American editor, business writer, and author
 Bethany Rooney, American television director and producer
 Bethany Shriever (born 1999) is a British BMX racer
 Bethany Veney (c. 1813–1916), American slave and autobiographer
 Bethany Walsh (born 1985), Australian synchronized swimmer
 Bethany Whitmore (born 1999), Australian actress

Fictional characters
 Bethany Cabe, fictional character in the Marvel Comics universe
 Bethany Dutton, a fictional character in Yellowstone.
 Bethany Platt, fictional character on Coronation Street
 Bethany Sloane, fictional lead character in the Kevin Smith film Dogma

Notes

English given names
Feminine given names